

This is a list of the National Register of Historic Places listings in Whatcom County, Washington.

This is intended to be a complete list of the properties and districts on the National Register of Historic Places in Whatcom County, Washington, United States. Latitude and longitude coordinates are provided for many National Register properties and districts; these locations may be seen together in a map.

There are 74 properties and districts listed on the National Register in the county. Another property was once listed but has been removed.

Current listings

|}

Former listings

|}

See also
List of National Historic Landmarks in Washington
National Register of Historic Places listings in Washington state

References

Whatcom
 N